According to the Talmud, there were 48 prophets and 7 prophetesses of Judaism. The last Jewish prophet is believed to have been Malachi. In Jewish tradition it is believed that the period of prophecy, called Nevuah, ended with Haggai, Zechariah, and Malachi at which time the "Shechinah departed from Israel".

Rabbinic tradition 
According to the Talmud, there were 48 prophets and 7 prophetesses who prophesied to Israel.

The 48 prophets to Israel

The 7 prophetesses to Israel

Additional prophets 
Although the Talmud states that only “48 prophets and 7 prophetesses prophesied to Israel”, it does not mean that there were only 55 prophets. The Talmud challenges this with other examples, and concludes by citing a Baraita tradition that the number of prophets in the era of prophecy was double the number of Israelites who left Egypt (600,000 males). The 55 prophets are recorded, because they made prophecies that have eternal relevance for future generations and not just for their own generation, or own ecstatic encounter with God. Hebrew scripture makes references to groups of such ecstatic prophets, for example concerning King Saul:

Prophets to other nations 
The Talmud lists 7 prophets to the nations of the world (gentiles):
 
 , father of Balaam

See also

References

 

de:Prophetie im Tanach